Aralioideae is a subfamily of flowering plants contains around 50 recognized genera. These include the genus Panax, to which ginseng belongs. Other notable species are the Angelica-tree (devil's walking-stick, Aralia spinosa), the devil's club (Oplopanax horridus), or common ivy (Hedera helix).

They are traditionally divided into a number of tribes. More recently it has turned out that the Aralieae and Schefflerieae were not accurately delimited. However, with moving some genera around, monophyly of each taxon can probably be achieved. Splitting the Panaceae from the Aralieae is rejected by the current state of knowledge, and whether the Schefflerieae can be accurately subdivided into the Plerandreae and Tetraplasandreae is at least highly doubtful. The Mackinlayeae seem to form a smaller and more basal lineage, but many other genera still await study.

Mackinlayeae
 Apiopetalum
 Mackinlaya
 Pseudosciadium

Aralieae
 Aralia
 Arthrophyllum
 Cuphocarpus
 Gastonia
 Meryta
 Munroidendron
 Panax
 Pentapanax
 Polyscias
 Pseudopanax
 Reynoldsia
 Sciadodendron
 Tetraplasandra

Schefflerieae
 Brassaiopsis
 Dendropanax
 Eleutherococcus
 × Fatshedera
 Fatsia
 Gamblea
 Hedera
 Heteropanax
 Kalopanax
 Macropanax
 Metapanax
 Oplopanax
 Oreopanax
 Schefflera – probably paraphyletic
 Sinopanax
 Tetrapanax
 Trevesia
 Tupidanthus

Placement unresolved
 Anakasia
 Astrotricha – basal?
 Cephalaralia – basal?
 Cheirodendron – basal?
 Cussonia – basal?
 Harmsiopanax
 Megalopanax
 Merrilliopanax
 Motherwellia
 Osmoxylon – basal?
 Raukaua – basal?
 Seemannaralia
 Stilbocarpa – basal? Possibly belongs into Apiaceae
 Woodburnia

References

 Crescent Bloom Plants. Retrieved April 11, 2007.

Araliaceae
Asterid subfamilies